Gravvik or Gravvika is a village in the municipality of Nærøysund in Trøndelag county, Norway. The village is located on an isthmus between the Årsetfjorden and the Eiterfjorden. Gravvik Church is located in the village.

Agriculture and fishing have traditionally been the primary industries in Gravvik. Today, fish farms, including both  salmon and halibut, as well as shellfish are local important industries.

The village was the administrative centre of the municipality of Gravvik from 1909 until its dissolution in 1964.

Fingalshulen
Fingalshulen is a cave and archaeological site at Gravvik. It contains 47 cave paintings, including of human figures and some animal shapes. The paintings have been estimated to date back 3000 years. Fingalshulen was first described in the 1800s, but was archaeologically investigated in 1960s. The cave was mapped by the Science Museum in Trondheim in 1962 and 1963. The cave has been the subject of major scientific studies, most recently during 2004. Fingalshulen is currently closed to the public.

References

External links
Gravvik website

Villages in Trøndelag
Nærøysund
Nærøy